Robin J. Vos (born July 5, 1968) is an American businessman and Republican politician and the 79th speaker of the Wisconsin State Assembly, serving in that role since 2013. He has been a member of the Assembly since 2005, representing most of the southern half of Racine County. Vos is also president of the National Conference of State Legislatures.

Vos came to prominence for his role in shepherding legislation to weaken bargaining rights and labor unions in Wisconsin while Scott Walker was governor, which culminated in the 2012 Wisconsin gubernatorial recall election. During the governorship of Tony Evers, a Democrat, Vos has sought to curb the governor's powers. During the COVID-19 pandemic, Vos blocked Evers's efforts to increase the safety and accessibility of elections, sought to hinder public health measures to mitigate the pandemic, such as mask mandates, and opposed vaccine requirements by private businesses.

After Joe Biden won the 2020 election and Donald Trump refused to concede while making claims of fraud, Vos appropriated $680,000 in taxpayer money to fund an investigation by Michael Gableman into fraud in the 2020 election. Gableman's appointment came a day after Trump had accused Vos of participating in a coverup of the election. In March 2022, Gableman released a report rife with false claims of fraud and conspiracy theories. Vos fired Gableman in August 2022, three days after a primary election in which Gableman had endorsed Vos's challenger. At the time of his firing, Gableman's investigation had already cost Wisconsin taxpayers more than $1,000,000, but the costs continued to rise, climbing close to $2.5 million, as lawsuits related to the practices of his investigation continued more than six months later.

Early life and education 
Vos was born in 1968, in Burlington, Wisconsin, in Racine County. He graduated from Burlington High School in 1986.

Vos attended the University of Wisconsin–Whitewater, where he studied political science and public relations. While at Whitewater, he roomed with Reince Priebus, who later became chairman of the Republican Party of Wisconsin, chairman of the Republican National Committee, and White House chief of staff. In 1989, Wisconsin governor Tommy Thompson appointed Vos as a student representative on the University of Wisconsin board of regents. Vos graduated in 1991.

Business career and early political career
After graduation, Vos worked as a legislative assistant to state representatives Jim Ladwig and Bonnie Ladwig. In 1994, Vos was elected to the Racine county board of supervisors. He remained on the board for the next 10 years. Also in 1994, Vos worked as district director for U.S. representative Mark Neumann of Wisconsin.

In 1996 Vos purchased the RoJos Popcorn Company in Burlington. In 2020, his popcorn business, Robin J. Vos Enterprises, received more than $150,000 in coronavirus relief from the Paycheck Protection Program.

Vos has an ownership stake of $4.8 million in rental properties in Whitewater, Wisconsin. In 2021, Vos led Republican efforts in the Wisconsin legislature to redirect COVID-19 relief payments so that they would go directly to landlords, such as himself, rather than renters.

Wisconsin state legislature
In 2004, Vos ran for the Wisconsin state assembly to succeed Ladwig in the 63rd district. He was unopposed in the 2004 primary and general elections.

After Republicans won full control of state government in Wisconsin in 2010, Vos rose to prominence pushing the controversial budget restructuring act alongside governor Scott Walker. The law curtailed collective bargaining rights and public education funding in Wisconsin, and led to massive protests around the state, culminating in the 2012 Wisconsin gubernatorial recall election.

In 2013, Vos was elected speaker of the Wisconsin assembly. Between 2014 and 2018 he received about $57,000 in travel and perks from lobbyists and organizations. He said he was certain he had followed ethics rules with his travel. Vos supports deregulating the payday loan industry. He opposes Medicaid expansion and spearheaded Republican efforts to block Medicaid expansion in Wisconsin. Vos argued against Medicaid, saying "Trapping people in the life of poverty is not something that there's ever the right amount of money to do."

In 2016 Vos endorsed Marco Rubio for the Republican nomination for president. After Rubio dropped out of the race, Vos endorsed Ted Cruz. In August 2016, Vos wrote in a column on a conservative website that he was "embarrassed" that Donald Trump was "leading our ticket" as the presumptive Republican nominee; the next month, Vos said that he was "proud" to support Trump's candidacy due to his belief that Trump would energize Republican voters.

In February 2019 Vos defended Brian Hagedorn, a judge of the Wisconsin Court of Appeals running for a seat on the Wisconsin Supreme Court, amid reports that Hagedorn had founded a school in 2016 that allowed for the expulsion of students and faculty if they were gay. Vos said he believed Hagedorn could rule fairly on LGBT issues.

In July 2019 Vos was widely criticized for refusing to prohibit overnight floor sessions or allow Democratic lawmaker Jimmy Anderson, who is paralyzed and uses a wheelchair, to phone into committee meetings. He later accused Anderson of political grandstanding and attempting to sabotage him as Vos took on his new national role as head of the National Conference of State Legislatures.

In November 2020, Vos was reelected by 16 percentage points.

In February 2021, Vos sent a letter to the governor asking him to order that flags on state buildings be lowered in honor of right-wing radio host Rush Limbaugh, who had recently died. Lauded by conservatives, Limbaugh was a divisive figure criticized for his derogatory comments about women, racial minorities and LGBT people, as well as on-air promotion of conspiracy theories and falsehoods. Vos praised Limbaugh as "a pioneer in talk radio, a best-selling author and a commentator who inspired generations to become active in politics."

In October 2021, Vos defended a heavily pro-Republican gerrymandered redistricting map for Wisconsin. 63 of the 99 Assembly seats and 23 of the 33 Senate seats in the map leaned toward Republicans.

Curbing the powers of the Evers administration 
Vos has been described as having a significant role in countering Governor Tony Evers. After Evers, the Democratic nominee, won the 2018 Wisconsin gubernatorial election, defeating incumbent governor Scott Walker, Vos was the first public official to propose curbing the incoming governor's powers. He claimed it was to restore a balance of power between the governor and the legislature, despite having previously voted to expand gubernatorial power. Vos also said the changes were intended to lock in laws passed by Republicans and to prevent the incoming Democratic administration from fulfilling its campaign pledges, particularly a pledge to withdraw Wisconsin from a lawsuit seeking to overturn the federal Affordable Care Act. The Republican-led legislature was called into a December lame duck session and passed laws decreasing the powers of the incoming governor, limiting early voting, and giving the legislature more control. Walker then signed the bills.

Christopher Beem of the McCourtney Institute of Democracy at Pennsylvania State University described Wisconsin Republicans' power grab as a "deeply undemocratic act" that, while possibly legal, eroded democratic norms by frustrating the expressed will of a majority of the electorate, immediately after an election, to make it "more difficult for the incoming administration to undertake actions that the majority has just shown that it wants." In June 2019, the Wisconsin Supreme Court rejected a challenge brought by the League of Women Voters and other groups to the laws enacted in the December 2018 lame-duck session, ruling in a 4–3 decision that extraordinary sessions are constitutional.

In 2021, Politico wrote that Vos was effectively a shadow governor of Wisconsin as he and the Republican majority in the state senate had used their powers "to block, thwart or resist almost every significant move made by Democratic Gov. Tony Evers."

COVID-19 pandemic 

In April 2020, amid the coronavirus pandemic, Vos opposed calls by Wisconsin Governor Tony Evers, a Democrat, to delay the state's primary election from early April to late May, to make it a mail-in election, and to mail ballots to all registered voters. The legislature adjourned without taking action on any of those proposals. When the governor then issued a last-minute emergency order to suspend in-person voting, Vos and the state senate majority leader appealed the order to the state supreme court, which overturned it, and the election was held as scheduled. Due to the coronavirus pandemic, it was estimated that many voters would be effectively disenfranchised, and in-person voting was also considered a public health risk. According to the Milwaukee Journal Sentinel, "Vos had no answer to how local election officials are supposed to keep people safe as a massive shortage of poll workers has resulted in the closure or reduction of polling locations, forcing more people to vote at a single site." Vos said, "If you are bored at home and sick of watching Netflix, volunteer to go and help at the polls."

On election day, Vos served as an election inspector. While dressed in full-body personal protective equipment, he said it was "incredibly safe" to vote at the polls. Vos later clarified that the city he was volunteering for required that he wear the protective equipment.

Because the Republican-controlled Wisconsin Legislature did not timely waive a requirement that unemployed Wisconsinites wait a week before they can be reimbursed unemployment benefits, Wisconsin lost $25 million in federal funding from the CARES Act. Vos and Senate Majority Leader Scott Fitzgerald had been warned that this would happen if the waiver was not passed in time.

In October 2020, during the pandemic, Vos and Fitzgerald filed a brief in support of a lawsuit by the right-wing law firm Wisconsin Institute for Law and Liberty that sought to block a statewide mandate, issued by Governor Evers, requiring the wearing of face masks in indoor public places to prevent the spread of the virus. Evers issued the mandate at a time when cases and hospitalizations in Wisconsin were surging, straining the state's hospital systems. The legislature could have convened a session to terminate the health emergency declaration and strike down Evers's mandate, but Wisconsin Republicans opted to go to court instead, so as to prevent vulnerable Republican legislators from having to vote against face mask mandates just before an election. A state judge rejected the attempt to strike down Evers's order, finding that state law "gives the governor broad discretion to act whenever conditions in the state constitute a public health emergency" and considering the fact that "The legislature can end the state of emergency at any time, but so far, it has declined to do so."

In March 2021, after Congress passed a $1.9 trillion COVID-relief stimulus package, Vos suggested that Wisconsin should reject the federal government's assistance to provide the unemployed with unemployment benefits for their first week of unemployment.

In November 2021, Vos said that members of the bipartisan Wisconsin Elections Commission (WEC) should "probably" face felony charges for easing some of the regulations around voting in nursing homes during the COVID-19 pandemic.

Vos opposes vaccine requirements for private businesses' employees and customers. In December 2021, he criticized vaccine requirements for health care workers, blaming the requirements for bed shortages at hospitals.

False claims of election fraud 
In November 2020, days after the unofficial count showed Joe Biden winning Wisconsin in the 2020 presidential election by 20,000 votes, Vos directed an investigatory committee to review how the election was administered. This came as Trump made false claims of election fraud. Vos also made misleading claims about the election process. In May 2021, Vos appropriated $680,000 in taxpayer money to fund an investigation by Michael Gableman into fraud in the 2020 election; there was no evidence of substantial fraud in the election and all lawsuits that claimed fraud were dismissed by courts. When asked whether it was a conspiracy theory that the 2020 election was stolen, Vos said it was not.

Gableman released his interim report in March 2022. The report endorsed numerous debunked claims of fraud and conspiracy theories. It also made false assertions about lawmakers' power to decertify Biden's victory. Gableman's report cited The Gateway Pundit, a far-right conspiracy website. Wisconsin Governor Tony Evers called the report "a colossal waste of taxpayer dollars". Shortly after the report's release, Vos signed a new contract with Gableman to extend his investigation. At the same time, both Trump and Gableman criticized Vos for not supporting decertification of Biden's victory, and both endorsed his primary opponent. The August 2022 primary was the closest race of Vos's career: he defeated election denier and Christian nationalist Adam Steen by fewer than 300 votes. Donald Trump endorsed Steen after Vos refused to fully support unsubstantiated claims that the 2020 presidential election was stolen. Three days after winning the primary, Vos fired Gableman, calling him "an embarrassment to the state".

Memberships
Vos is second vice-chair of the board of directors of the State Legislative Leaders Foundation. A member of the American Legislative Exchange Council (ALEC), Vos is the group's former Wisconsin state chair.

Electoral history

Wisconsin Assembly (2004–present)

References

External links
 Representative Robin Vos - Speaker at Wisconsin Legislature (2023)
 National Conference of State Legislatures website
 Vos for Assembly (Campaign site)
 
 
 RoJo's Popcorn (Family business)

|-

1968 births
21st-century American politicians
Businesspeople from Wisconsin
County supervisors in Wisconsin
Living people
United States congressional aides
People from Burlington, Wisconsin
Speakers of the Wisconsin State Assembly
Republican Party members of the Wisconsin State Assembly
University of Wisconsin–Whitewater alumni